The Boeing MQ-28 Ghost Bat, previously known as the Boeing Airpower Teaming System (ATS) and the Loyal Wingman project, is a stealth, multirole, unmanned aerial vehicle in development by Boeing Australia for the Royal Australian Air Force (RAAF). It is designed as a force multiplier aircraft capable of flying alongside manned aircraft for support and performing autonomous missions independently using artificial intelligence.

Development
The Ghost Bat is an unmanned aircraft, with a current planned introduction date in 2024-25, which incorporates artificial intelligence and utilises a modular mission package system in the nose where the entire nose of the aircraft can be removed and quickly swapped for another nose with a different set of equipment or armaments for various missions including combat, force reconnaissance and electronic warfare. One role will be to support and protect manned Royal Australian Air Force (RAAF) aircraft, such as the F-35A, F/A-18F, E-7A, and KC-30A whilst they conduct operations. The UAV will be designed to act as a "loyal wingman" that is controlled by a parent aircraft to accomplish tasks such as scouting or absorbing enemy fire if attacked as well as operating independently.

The aircraft will be the first combat aircraft designed and developed in Australia in over half a century. In February 2019, Boeing said that it will "depend on the market" whether the aircraft is manufactured in Queensland or the United States. On 21 September 2021, Boeing Australia unveiled the launch of a new manufacturing facility for its Loyal Wingman unmanned aircraft at Wellcamp Airport in Toowoomba, Queensland.

The RAAF initially planned to buy three Airpower Teaming System (ATS) systems, as part of the Loyal Wingman Advanced Development Program (LWADP). The three drones were built at an automated production line in Brisbane, Queensland. The production line is a proof of concept for full-scale production. The order was increased to six with an A$115M contract days after the first flight.

Unveiling
After a full-scale mock-up was revealed at the 2019 Avalon Airshow, the first real aircraft achieved a power-on of its systems in March 2020, and was rolled out in May 2020 by Boeing Australia with the release of images showing a detailed prototype of the aircraft and a video to illustrate the drone's operational abilities. In May 2022, Australian Prime Minister Scott Morrison said "This is a truly historic moment for our country and for Australian defence innovation. The Loyal Wingman will be pivotal to exploring the critical capabilities our Air Force needs to protect our nation and its allies into the future."

Testing
Boeing announced it powered up the engine of its first Airpower Teaming System (ATS) unmanned aircraft for the first time in September 2020. The engine test is part of ground testing to prepare for first flight before the end of 2020.

The Boeing Airpower Teaming System (ATS) prototype moved under its own power for the first time in October 2020, conducting low-speed taxi tests at RAAF Base Amberley. The Boeing Airpower Teaming System later performed a high-speed taxi test at an unnamed remote location in December 2020.

The first test flight of the prototype occurred at RAAF Base Woomera on 27 February 2021.

Two more test flights occurred at RAAF Woomera Range Complex sometime in early November 2021 where a prototype successfully raised and engaged its landing gear while a second prototype completed its first test flight.

Service name
An official naming ceremony was held at RAAF Base Amberley on 21 March 2022 to announce the Loyal Wingman would be known as the MQ-28A Ghost Bat in RAAF service, named after an Australian bat found in northern parts of the Australian continent. The ghost bat is an Australian native mammal known for teaming together in a pack to detect and hunt, which reflects the unique characteristics of the aircraft’s sensors and intelligence, surveillance and reconnaissance abilities.

Possible USAF use
In August 2022 it was revealed by United States Secretary of the Air Force Frank Kendall that preliminary discussions were being held into purchasing the MQ-28 for United States service.

Specifications

See also
 AVIC Dark Sword
 BAE Taranis
 Baykar Bayraktar Kızılelma
 Boeing MQ-25 Stingray
 HAL Combat Air Teaming System
 General Atomics MQ-20 Avenger
 Kratos XQ-58 Valkyrie

References

External links
 Boeing: Boeing Australia - Airpower Teaming System

2010s Australian aircraft
Australian military aircraft
Boeing
Royal Australian Air Force
Unmanned aerial vehicles of Australia
Aircraft first flown in 2021